Orión was the designation of a sounding rocket of Argentina, which was started between 1965 and 1971 at CELPA, Mar Chiquita, Tartagal and Wallops Island. In November 1966, three tests of the Argentine-built Orion rockets took place.

Developed by the Instituto de Investigaciones Aeronauticas y Espaciales (IIAE), Orión marked Argentina's entry into the club of space-faring nations.

The first version Orión-1 was flown twice in 1965 and 1966 in order to test the engines and technologies; with a length of  it was limited to a  payload. The production version Orión-2 was launched 22 times from 1966 to 1971.

References 

Sounding rockets of Argentina
Space programme of Argentina
Solid-fuel rockets